Walter Alexander Elwell (born April 29, 1937) is an evangelical theological academic. He is most noted for his editorial output numbering several evangelical standard reference works. He taught at Wheaton College, Illinois from 1975 to 2003 before retirement and is now professor emeritus of Bible and Theology at Wheaton College.

Elwell was educated at Wheaton College where he earned his B.A. and M.A. He was awarded his Ph.D. in 1970 from the University of Edinburgh after spending time at then attended the University of Chicago and University of Tübingen. He consultanted for both the Evangelical Christian Publishers Association and the Evangelical Book Club. He is also a member of the Society of Biblical Literature, Institute for Biblical Research, Evangelical Theological Society, and Chicago Society of Biblical Research. He has taught Greek at North Park College in Chicago, Illinois and a professor of Bible at Belhaven College in Jackson, Mississippi.

Elwell was born in Miami, Florida, United States and is married to Barbara Jean Elwell.

Selected works

Books

 - first published 1984

References

1937 births
Living people
Bible commentators
Wheaton College (Illinois) faculty
Wheaton College (Illinois) alumni
University of Chicago alumni
University of Tübingen alumni
Alumni of the University of Edinburgh
People from Miami